Pedro Rodríguez de Castro (fl. 1171–1191), second son of Rodrigo Fernández de Castro the bald and Eylo Álvarez, daughter of Álvar Fáñez, and of the Countess Mayor Perez, was a Castilian nobleman of the lineage of the Castro. Just like his great-grandfather, count Pedro Ansúrez, he was Butler of Leon in 1184 and tenente of Grado, Tineo, Pravia, and Limia. The Count of Barcelos in his Nobiliario, and Argote de Molina in his nobility of Andalusia, called him "the monk" as he entered religion after becoming a widower.

He was married before 1171 to Urraca Guzmán Rodríguez, daughter of Rodrigo Muñoz de Guzmán and Mayor Díaz, who possibly had no offspring.

On 19 December 1187, king Alfonso VIII of Castile, in thanks for joining the services of the Castilian Crown, donated to him the villas of Villasila and Villamelendro.

Pedro Rodríguez de Castro died after 22 November 1191, date of its last appearance in medieval documentation.

Notes

References

Sources 
 
  
 
 

12th-century births
1191 deaths
12th-century nobility from León and Castile